La Palma Municipal Museum is a museum located in the Martí street in La Palma, Cuba. The building was constructed in 1892 and was owned by José López Queipo. It was established as a museum on 31 May 1982.

The museum holds 11 sections (history, archaeology, weapons, numismatics, arts, documents among others) and 21 collections.

It has been closed since 1997 but research and preservation tasks are still on-going.

See also 
 List of museums in Cuba

References 

Museums in Cuba
Buildings and structures in Pinar del Río Province
Museums established in 1982
1982 establishments in Cuba
20th-century architecture in Cuba